Igor Bijelić (born Avgust 9, 1988) is a Montenegrin professional basketball player.

External links

References

1988 births
Living people
KK FMP (1991–2011) players
KK Sutjeska players
KK Rabotnički players
Montenegrin expatriate basketball people in Serbia
Montenegrin men's basketball players
Sportspeople from Nikšić
Power forwards (basketball)